The Golden Snake is a 2007 Russian fantasy drama film directed by Vladimir Makeranets. It is an loose adaptation of Pavel Bazhov's story "The Great Snake" based on the Ural region Russian folklore. It was financed of the Ministry of Culture of Sverdlovsk Oblast and the Federal Agency for Culture and Cinematography. The Golden Snake  was awarded the "Best Children's Film" prize at the Russian film festival Literatura i Kino in 2008.

In the film, two boys meet the legendary creature the Great Snake (also translated as Poloz the Great Snake) from the Ural folklore that has control over gold.

Cast
 Ivan Bobylyov as Semyonitch / Poloz the Great Snake 
 Oleg Yagodin as Koska (adult)
 Yaroslav Andreev as Koska (child)
 Pavel Oznobishin as Deniska (adult)
 Vanya Sukhoverkhy as Deniska (child)
 Yelena Golunenko as Dunyasha
 Valery Smirnov as Zhabrey
 Vladimir Ivansky as Levonty
 Anton Kazakov as Pantyukha
 Dmitry Zakharov as Nikolka (adult)
 Alexander Mikhailov as Nikolka (young)
 Vyacheslav Kokorin as Yefimitch
 Vyacheslav Chuisov as Matvey
 Valery Seregin as Osip

References

External links
 

2007 films
2000s fantasy drama films
2000s Russian-language films
Russian fantasy drama films
Films based on Russian folklore
2000s children's fantasy films
Films about mining